"Light" is a future bass song by Dutch producer San Holo with uncredited vocals by Dutch vocalist Tessa Douwstra. The song was released via Holo's label Bitbird on 22 November 2016 and peaked at 13 on Billboards Dance chart and has been certified gold in the United States.

Reception
Katey Ceccarelli of Earmilk called the song "multifaceted". Run the Trap praised the "beautiful, catchy vocals into an incredible drop". Harrison Kefford of Interns stated: "It’s [a] classic...San Holo showcase with its dreamy and sparkly synths and heavenly vocal work."

Music video
A music video for Light was released in May 2017. The music video features a young adult couple with supernatural powers who burn when in contact with natural light. The video ends with the pair watching a solar eclipse.

Track listings

Charts

Weekly charts

Year-end charts

Certifications

References

External links
 

2016 singles
2016 songs
Future bass songs
Music published by Bitbird